William Fadjo Cravens (February 15, 1899 – April 16, 1974) was an American politician and a United States Congressman (Democrat, Arkansas).

Biography
Cravens was born on February 15, 1899, in Fort Smith, Arkansas, the son of Arkansas Congressman William B. Cravens and Carolyn (Dyal) Cravens. He attended the University of Arkansas and the University of Pittsburgh; he also attended Washington & Lee University in Lexington, Virginia, from which he received a law degree. He was married on February 16, 1926, to Elizabeth B. Echols and they had two children, Katherine Elizabeth Cravens and William Fadjo Cravens.

Career
Cravens served in World War I in the United States Navy as a seaman. He passed the bar in 1920 and began a law practice in Fort Smith. He took the position of City Attorney in Fort Smith.

Elected to the 76th United States Congress in a special election, Cravens filled the term of his father, William Ben Cravens, who had died in office, Cravens was re-elected, and served in Congress from September 12, 1939, to January 3, 1949.

Death
Cravens died in Fort Smith, Sebastian County, Arkansas, on April 16, 1974 (age 75 years, 60 days). He is interred at Forest Park Cemetery, Fort Smith, Arkansas.

References

External links

1899 births
1974 deaths
Politicians from Fort Smith, Arkansas
American people of English descent
Democratic Party members of the United States House of Representatives from Arkansas
Arkansas lawyers
University of Arkansas alumni
University of Pittsburgh alumni
Washington and Lee University School of Law alumni
United States Navy sailors
American military personnel of World War I